Kim Jung-jun (born 26 August 1978) is a South Korean paralympic badminton player. He participated at the 2020 Summer Paralympics in the badminton competition, being awarded the silver medal in the men's singles WH2 event. Jung-jun also participated in the men's doubles WH1–WH2 event, being awarded the silver medal with his teammate, Lee Dong-seop.

Achievements

Paralympic Games 
Men's singles WH2

Men's doubles WH1–WH2

World Championships 
Men's singles WH2

Men's doubles WH1–WH2

Mixed doubles WH1–WH2

Asian Para Games 
Men's singles

Men's doubles

Mixed doubles

Asian Championships 
Men's singles

Men's doubles

Mixed doubles

BWF Para Badminton World Circuit (3 titles, 2 runners-up) 
The BWF Para Badminton World Circuit – Grade 2, Level 1, 2 and 3 tournaments has been sanctioned by the Badminton World Federation from 2022.

Men's singles

Men's doubles

International Tournaments (35 titles, 9 runners-up) 
Men's singles

Men's doubles

Mixed doubles

References

Notes 

Living people
Place of birth missing (living people)
South Korean male badminton players
Paralympic silver medalists for South Korea
Paralympic medalists in badminton
Badminton players at the 2020 Summer Paralympics
Medalists at the 2020 Summer Paralympics
1978 births